Léon Eugène Bérard (17 February 1870, in Morez – 2 September 1956, in Lyon) was a French surgeon and oncologist. He was the younger brother of Hellenist scholar Victor Bérard (1864–1931).

Life 
He studied medicine in Lyon obtaining his doctorate in 1896. In 1898 he earned his agrégation in surgery, later being assigned as a surgeon to Lyon hospitals (1901). In 1914 he became a professor of clinical surgery, and from 1923 to 1940 served as director of the cancer centre in Lyon (later named the "Centre Léon-Bérard" in his honor).

Known for his pioneer work in the fight against cancer, he was among the first physicians to utilize radium as a treatment for cancer of the buccal mucosa and for cancer of the cervix.

He was a member of the Société de chirurgie de Lyon and of the Société nationale de médecine et des sciences médicales de Lyon. From 1946 to 1956 he was a corresponding member of the Académie des sciences.

Selected works 
 Contribution à l'anatomie et à la chirurgie du goître : parallèle entre la thyroïdectomie partielle, les énucléations et l'exothyropexie, 1896 (under the direction of Antonin Poncet) – Contribution to the anatomy and surgery of goiter: Parallel partial thyroidectomy between enucleation and exothyropexy.
 Traité clinique de l'actinomycose humaine, pseudo-actinomycose et botryomycose, 1899 (with Antonin Poncet) – Clinical treatise on human actinomycosis, pseudo-actinomycosis and botryomycosis.
 Cancer de l'oesophage, 1927 – Cancer of the esophagus.
 Affections chirurgicales du corps thyroïde, 1929 – Surgical diseases of the thyroid gland.

References

External links
 

1870 births
1956 deaths
University of Lyon alumni
Academic staff of the University of Lyon
People from Jura (department)
French surgeons
French oncologists